Days Gone By may refer to:

Albums
Days Gone By (James House album), 1995
Days Gone By (Bob Moses album), 2015

Songs
"Days Gone By", an 1870s song by Joseph Philip Knight
"Days Gone By", a song from the 1998 Poco album The Ultimate Collection
"Days Gone By", a song from the 1973 Joe Walsh album The Smoker You Drink, the Player You Get
"Days Gone By", a song from the 1995 Ronnie Hawkins from Let It Rock
"Days Gone By", a song from the 1992 Slaughter album The Wild Life
"Days Gone By", a 1965 song by Eddy Arnold
"Days Gone By", a song from the 1993 Godstar album Sleeper
"Days Gone By", a song from the 1995 James House album Days Gone By

See also
Days Gone Bye (disambiguation)
Days Go By (The Offspring album), 2012